Debaloy Bhattacharya is an Indian film director, actor, writer and editor associated with Bengali films. Latest movies which Debaloy Bhattacharya has directed are Dracula Sir, Biday Byomkesh and Roga Howar Sohoj Upay

Career

Debaloy Bhattacharya started his career in the Indian film industry as an editor, he made his debut with Shoonya (2006) and later worked as an editor in 033 (2009), which also marked his debut as a writer in a feature film. The editor-turned-writer later wrote screenplay, story, and dialogues for several popular Bengali films including Obhishopto Nighty (2014), Roga Howar Sohoj Upay (2015).

Debaloy Bhattacharya has directed films and TV series, his maiden feature film directorial venture was Roga Howar Sohoj Upay (2015) and his 2018 venture includes Bidaay Byomkesh (2018), a Bengali drama starring Abir Chatterjee, Sohini Sarkar, Joy Sengupta and Rahul Banerjee.

Filmography

References

External links

21st-century Indian film directors
Living people
Place of birth missing (living people)
Date of birth missing (living people)
People from Kolkata
Bengali film directors
Year of birth missing (living people)
Film directors from Kolkata